Orocrambus lindsayi is a moth in the family Crambidae. It was described by David E. Gaskin in 1975. It is found in New Zealand, where it has been recorded from Mount Ida in Otago.

The wingspan is about 22 mm. The forewings are grey, sprinkled with white and dark brown. The hindwings are greyish white. Adults have been recorded in February.

References

Crambinae
Moths described in 1975
Moths of New Zealand
Endemic fauna of New Zealand
Endemic moths of New Zealand